Finally! is the first and only album by Filipino TV personality and actress, Iya Villania.

Track listing

References

External links
 Finally! @ Titik Pilipino Filipino Songs Online Resource

2008 debut albums